Elzach (Low Alemannic: Elze) is a town in the district of Emmendingen, in Baden-Württemberg, Germany. It is situated on the river Elz, 26 km northeast of Freiburg.

Geography
The town of Elzach is located at the eastern border of the district of Emmendingen and borders on the district of the  Ortenaukreis and the Schwarzwald-Baar-Kreis. Topographically is the area characterised by the river valley of the Elz and the local hill called Rohrhardsberg. Also Elzach belongs to the Breisgau area and is located at the edge of the Southern Black Forest Nature Park.

Urban districts
 Elzach
 Yach
 Prechtal
 Oberprechtal
 Katzenmoos

Gallery

International relations

Elzach is twinned with: 
 Worthing, United Kingdom
 Ville, France
 Telfs, Austria

Sons and daughters of the town
 Hermann Dietrich (1879-1954)  German politician of the liberal German Democratic Party, minister during the Weimar Republic

References

Emmendingen (district)
Baden